Remote may refer to:

Arts, entertainment, and media
 Remote (1993 film), a 1993 movie
 Remote (2004 film), a Tamil-language action drama film
 Remote (album), a 1988 album by Hue & Cry
 Remote (band), ambient chillout band
 Remote (manga), a 2002 manga
 Remote broadcast, commonly known in broadcasting as a person or a live remote

Computing and technology
 Remote (Apple software), software application made by Apple Inc. for the iOS
  Remote control, commonly known as a remote 
 Remote control car, a car that can be controlled from a distance
 Remote desktop or operating system, can be controlled by another system device
 Remote operation

Places
 Remote, Oregon
 Remote Peninsula, Canada
 Remote Western Australia

Other uses
 Remote and isolated community, a community in a remote location
 Remote learning, distance learning
 Remote, to implement a remotion, withdrawal of a privatdozent academic teaching license

See also
 Remote access (disambiguation)
 Remoteness (disambiguation), various meanings:
 Extreme points of Earth#Remoteness, inaccessible places on land and places in the ocean which are far from land
 Remoteness in English law, the legal concept of how remotely possible a consequence is (or should have been foreseen to be)